American Idol Season 11 Duets and Trios Highlights is a compilation album by Top 6 finalists of American Idol. The album was released exclusively through Walmart and consists of a few studio recordings made by the finalists during season 11 of American Idol. It includes four studio recordings of duets and one studio recording of trios. As of July 2012, it has sold 3,000 copies.

Track listing

Charts

References

2012 compilation albums
American Idol albums